Apomyelois is a genus of small moths belonging to the family Pyralidae. The genus was erected by Carl Heinrich in 1956.

Species of Apomyelois

 Apomyelois artonoma (Meyrick, 1935)
 Apomyelois bicolorata Balinsky, 1991
 Apomyelois bistriatella (Hulst, 1887)
 Apomyelois cognata (Staudinger, 1871)
 Apomyelois decolor (Zeller, 1881)
 Apomyelois ehrendorferi (Malicky & Roesler, 1970)

The former A. striatella is now in Didia. The locust bean moth (A. ceratoniae) is placed in Ectomyelois by some authors, while others place Ectomyelois as a synonym of Apomyelois.

Footnotes

References
  (2005): Markku Savela's Lepidoptera and Some Other Life Forms – Apomyelois. Version of 8 September 2005. Retrieved 10 April 2010.

Phycitini
Pyralidae genera